The following is a summary of Donegal county football team's 2022 season.

Declan Bonner was reappointed for another two-year term as manager at the end of August 2021 when no other candidates emerged to succeed him.

A new kit was launched, featuring a "shadow print" naming each of the county's clubs. Players shirts began to feature "Circet" on the front, as the "KN Group" rebranded. Sleeve sponsors were POD-TRAK and Global Hydrate, with Abbey Hotel on the back of the player shirts.

Squad
List of players

Neil McGee remained injured ahead of the season, following the 2021 Ulster Senior Football Championship semi-final against Tyrone. He would retire at the end of the year.

Oisín Gallen appeared as a substitute in the 2022 National Football League fixture against Tyrone but then sustained an injury, missing the 2022 Ulster Senior Football Championship, including the final.

Minor panel (Ulster Minor Football League)
Zach Conlon (Malin), J. P. McGuinness (Killybegs), Fiachra McClafferty (Downings), Donal Gallagher (Glenswilly), Gareth Gallagher (Termon), Danny Diver (Carndonagh), Jack Long (Glenfin), Oisín Scanlon (St Eunan's), Shaun McMenamin (MacCumhaill's), Sean Martin (MacCumhaill's), Eoghan Kelly (Aodh Ruadh), Niall Prendiville (St Naul's), Cian McGee (An Clochán Liath), Finbarr Roarty (Naomh Conaill), Shane Delahunty (Aodh Ruadh), Eoghan Scott (Glenswilly), Ben Rafferty (Kilcar), Cian McMenamin (Termon), Sean McLaughlin (Buncrana), Lorcan McGee (Cloughaneely), Conor McGinty (MacCumahill's), Odhran Doherty (Naomh Conaill), Mark McDevitt (Naomh Conaill), Max Roarty (St Michael's), Odhran O'Connor (Glenfin), Gavin Doherty (Killybegs), Karl Joseph Molloy (Ardara), Ryan Barrett (Bundoran), Kevin Lynch (Naomh Pádraig, Muff), Daithi Gildea (Glenswilly), Padraig Coyle (Cloughaneely), Senan Carr (Four Masters), Jack Hegarty (Naomh Ultan), Shane Callaghan (Naomh Columba). Manager: Luke Barrett (third season)

Personnel changes
Paddy Campbell joined the management team. Also joining the management team were Dr Ciarán Kearney and — as strength and conditioning coach — Mattie Brady. Part of the responsibility of Brady — originally from Clonoe, County Tyrone — was to work with players arriving into the senior squad from underage teams.

Paddy McGrath, who won the Sam Maguire Cup in the 2012 season, announced his retirement from inter-county football ahead of the 2022 season. Odhrán Mac Niallais also opted to depart.

Competitions

Dr McKenna Cup

The group draw took place on 15 December 2021. Donegal won three games from four and advanced as far as the final.

Nine players made their senior debut in this competition, though only three — Odhran Doherty, Charles McGuinness and Shane O'Donnell — played in each of the four games.

Fixtures

2022 National Football League Division 1

Ahead of the final round of fixtures (and Donegal's game against Armagh), injuries ruled out Oisín Gallen, Michael Langan, Caolan McGonagle, Niall O'Donnell and Ciarán Thompson.

Eunan Doherty made a substitute appearance against Mayo.

Charles McGuinness, Shane O'Donnell and Mark Curran made substitute appearances against Kildare.

Shane McDonnell (O'Donnell?) and Rory O'Donnell started against Kerry.

Shane O'Donnell started against Tyrone.

Charles McGuinness started against Monaghan and Eunan Doherty made a substitute appearance.

Shane O'Donnell made a substitute appearance against Dublin.

Shane O'Donnell started against Armagh.

Table

Fixtures

Ulster Senior Football Championship

The draw for the 2021 Ulster Championship was made on 28 November 2021.

Shane O'Donnell started and scored a point against Armagh. He also started against Cavan and Derry.

Bracket

Fixtures

All-Ireland Senior Football Championship

According to Armagh's coach Kieran Donaghy, it was the decision of the players to push up against Donegal goalkeeper Shaun Patton's kick-outs in the 2022 All-Ireland SFC qualifier win — a decision that brought them back into the game. Donaghy said: "The boys have to get all the credit really because it was going away from us. We got the electric start (with Rory Grugan's goal after 10 seconds) then conceded six points in a row, but the lads wanted to push up on Patton's kick-out. We were in the stage of 'do we try to hold on until half-time then push on' but Rory Grugan said 'no, we're going to push up on it'. I think those two turnovers, we got the free then the black card and the penalty, they were a huge momentum lift. But I thought our half-back line was really good. Greg (McCabe) and Jarly Og (Burns) got a few vital turnovers before half-time and put us going the other way."

Pauric McShea wrote, following the season-ending loss to Armagh: "If there was a technical report on Donegal 2022 it would possibly read 'Too cautious and not emerging from their passivity to have a crack'". McShea also wrote: "Dismay at Donegal's demise in the championship this year should be partially offset by the team's display in the first quarter of our game with Armagh last Sunday week. This was football of the highest order and real football people would understand that Michael Murphy's presence was a major factor in this show of attacking excellence."

Management team
Confirmed in November 2017, with replacements noted:
Manager: Declan Bonner
Assistant manager: Paul McGonigle, not listed among November 2017 appointments
Paddy Campbell, joined ahead of the 2022 season
Head coach: John McElholm
Coach: Gary Boyle
Selector: Stephen Rochford, replacing Karl Lacey after 2018 season but Lacey actually carried on until the end of 2020
Goalkeeping coach: James Gallagher, after 2020 season replacing Andrew McGovern
Strength and conditioning coach: Mattie Brady, from 2022 season, replacing Antoin McFadden, who after 2020 season, replaced Paul Fisher
Nutritionist: Ronan Doherty
Team physician: Kevin Moran
Physio: Cathal Ellis
Psychology and performance manager: Anthony McGrath, previously involved with the minor team
Video analysis: Chris Byrne
Logistics: Packie McDyre
Kitman: Barry McBride
Dr Ciarán Kearney, ahead of 2022 season

Awards

GAA.ie Football Team of the Week
 31 January: Michael Langan
 7 February: Jason McGee, Ryan McHugh, Michael Langan
 28 February: Conor O'Donnell (nominated for Footballer of the Week)
 28 March: OMFF, Patrick McBrearty
 25 April: Shaun Patton, Brendan McCole, Michael Langan, Michael Murphy (Murphy voted Footballer of the Week)
 9 May: Shaun Patton, Stephen McMenamin, Eoghan Bán Gallagher, Jamie Brennan (Brennan nominated for Footballer of the Week)
 30 May: Peadar Mogan

References

Donegal
Donegal county football team seasons